White Man Mountain is located on the Continental Divide between Alberta and British Columbia. It was named by George Mercer Dawson in 1884 and is Alberta's 92nd most prominent mountain.

See also
 List of peaks on the Alberta–British Columbia border
 Mountains of Alberta
 Mountains of British Columbia

References

White Man Mountain
White Man Mountain
Canadian Rockies